Carina Aulenbrock (born ) is a German female volleyball player. She is part of the Germany women's national volleyball team.

She participated in the 2014 FIVB Volleyball World Grand Prix.
On club level she played for Schweriner SC in 2014.

References

1994 births
Living people
German women's volleyball players
Place of birth missing (living people)